Beaver may refer to the following places in the U.S. state of Michigan:

 Beaver, Bay County, Michigan
 Beaver, Delta County, Michigan
 Beaver Island, Michigan
 Beaver Township, Bay County, Michigan
 Beaver Township, Newaygo County, Michigan

See also 
 Beaverton, Michigan, city in Gladwin County
 Beaverton Township, Michigan in Gladwin County
 Beaver Creek Township, Michigan in Crawford County
 Beaver Island (Lake Michigan)